Scrobipalpa frugifera is a moth in the family Gelechiidae. It was described by Povolný in 1969. It is found in Mongolia and southern Siberia.

References

Scrobipalpa
Moths described in 1969
Taxa named by Dalibor Povolný